Little Red Moon is an album by the American jazz saxophonist Archie Shepp recorded in 1985 and released on the Italian Soul Note label.

Reception 
The Allmusic review by Scott Yanow awarded the album 2 stars, stating: "By 1985 Archie Shepp's tone on tenor had declined quite a bit from just a few years earlier.... Despite some good moments from the supporting cast, this is one to skip".

Track listing 
All compositions by Archie Shepp except as indicated
 "Little Red Moon" - 17:59 
 "Impromptu" - 4:00 
 "Naima" (John Coltrane) - 7:51 
 "Whisper Not" (Benny Golson) - 9:08 
 "Sweet Georgia Brown" (Ben Bernie, Kenneth Casey, Maceo Pinkard) - 6:59 
Recorded at Barigozzi Studio in Milano, Italy, on December 11, 12 & 13, 1985

Personnel 
 Archie Shepp – tenor saxophone, soprano saxophone, voice
 Enrico Rava - trumpet, flugelhorn
 Siegfried Kessler – piano, synthesizer
 Wilbur Little – bass
 Clifford Jarvis – drums

References 

Black Saint/Soul Note albums
Archie Shepp albums
1986 albums